Cairo Regional Airport,  is a county-owned public-use airport located  northwest of the central business district of Cairo, Illinois, a city in Alexander County, Illinois, United States. It is included in the Federal Aviation Administration (FAA) National Plan of Integrated Airport Systems for 2019–2023, in which it is categorized as a local general aviation facility.

Facilities and Aircraft 
Cairo Regional Airport covers an area of 470 acres (190.2 ha) at an elevation of 322 feet (98 m) above mean sea level. It has two runways: 14/32 is 4,001 by 100 feet (1,220 x 30 m) with an asphalt surface and 2/20 is 3,200 by 60 feet (975 x 16 m) with an asphalt surface.

The airport operates its own fixed-base operator on the field. The FBO offers fuel as well as a cafe, a lounge, rest rooms, flight planning stations, and refreshments.

For the 12-month period ending September 30, 2020, the airport had 9,000 aircraft operations, an average of 25 per day: 94% general aviation and 6% military. For the same time period, there were 12 airplanes based at this airport: 11 single engine and 1 multi engine.

See also
List of airports in Illinois

References

External links 
 

Cairo, Illinois
Airports in Illinois
Transportation buildings and structures in Alexander County, Illinois